The Glasgow Army Airfield Norden Bombsight Vault was listed on the National Register of Historic Places in 2011.

It is a one-story  concrete shed with an  projection that has -thick walls and a poured concrete floor.  It protected Norden bombsights at the Glasgow Army Air Field during World War II.  The bombsights were top-secret and were used on B-29 bombers.  It had steel vault doors which have been removed.

References

National Register of Historic Places in Valley County, Montana
Buildings and structures completed in the 1940s
Aerial bombing
Installations of the United States Army Air Forces